The World Currency Unit (WCU) is an indexed unit of account (unit of account) that stands for a unit of real global purchasing power. Proposed by Lok Sang Ho of Lingnan University, Hong Kong, it was first intended to be the basis for denominating global bonds, a debt instrument that is issued globally and subscribable by people and institutions around the world. Since each unit by design represents a stable unit of purchasing power, the stipulated interest rate on WCU-denominated bonds represents a real interest rate. In principle, the common denomination of bonds by issuers from different parts of the world using the WCU, as well as the greater transparency of real interest rates, will produce more efficient capital markets, as savers and borrowers around the world converge in their understanding of what each basis point of interest means and are protected against two key sources of uncertainty, namely inflation and exchange loss risks.

Irving Fisher in his 1911 book The Purchasing Power of Money had advised that, to serve as a unit of account, a trusted medium of exchange, and a reliable store of value, the purchasing power of money should be stable. Unfortunately, substances that exist by the bounty of nature, such as gold or silver, cannot have such property since their values fluctuate with changing supply and demand. This is the main motivation behind indexed units of account, of which Robert Shiller of Yale University is a principal proponent.
To be meaningful in terms of stable global purchasing power, a WCU will have to represent a basket of global output. By definition, according to the initial proposal by Ho, the WCU represents the sum of the gross domestic products of key market economies in the world, namely the USA, the Eurozone and UK, Japan, Canada, and Australia. Addition of these GDPs, each in a separate currency, is done by converting all GDPs into US dollar values in the base year.

The sum of these GDPs are then scaled down to equal $100 in the base year. The scaling factor then becomes part of the definition of the WCU, as it defines the size of the GDP basket. It is envisaged that every 5 or 10 years, the WCU can be rebased, with the new series using a new base year spliced to the old series much like consumer price indices with different base years are spliced to form a continuous series.

The formula for the valuation of the World Currency Unit has been revised since 2008 so that the GDP weights are now revised every year.  While still retaining the meaning of a unit of global real purchasing power, the WCU can now be interpreted as a GDP-weighted basket of currencies, each indexed against domestic inflation.  The GDP-weighted basket of currencies has now formed the basis for a new formula for the effective exchange rate.

The nominal value of this unit would rise with inflation in each economy. Moreover, the nominal value of this unit would rise if other currencies represented in the basket appreciate against the US dollar. Savers purchasing such bonds would not only enjoy protection against inflation, but would benefit from the diversification of exchange risks.

The WCU could be used for the pricing of commodities such as oil, precious metals, and agricultural products, which are typically quoted in US dollars. Of course, historical prices of commodities quoted in US dollars could also be converted into prices in WCUs to provide indications on trends in the real prices of these commodities.

See also
World currency unit
Wocu
Special drawing rights
Euro
North American currency union
African Monetary Union
Bancor

References 
 
 Coats, Warren(1989) "In Search of a Monetary Anchor : A 'New' Monetary Standard," IMF Working Paper No. 89/82.

External links 
 

Inflation
Global economic indicators